The following is a list of notable deaths in October 2010.

Entries for each day are listed alphabetically by surname. A typical entry lists information in the following sequence:
 Name, age, country of citizenship at birth, subsequent country of citizenship (if applicable), reason for notability, cause of death (if known), and reference.

October 2010

1
Georgy Arbatov, 87, Russian political scientist.
Dezső Bundzsák, 82, Hungarian football player and coach.
Ian Buxton, 72, English footballer and cricketer, natural causes.
Charles Caruana, 77, Gibraltarian Roman Catholic bishop of Gibraltar (1998–2010), complications from a fall.
Bobby Craig, 75, Scottish footballer.
Audouin Dollfus, 85, French astronomer.
Marshall Flaum, 85, American Emmy Award-winning director (The Undersea World of Jacques Cousteau), complications from hip surgery.
Kilian Hennessy, 103, Irish patriarch of the Hennessy cognac company.
Gerard Labuda, 93, Polish historian.
Michel Mathieu, 66, French diplomat, cancer.
David Aldrich Nelson, 78, American jurist, judge of the United States Court of Appeals for the Sixth Circuit.
William W. Norton, 85, American screenwriter (Gator, Brannigan), heart attack.
William C. Patrick III, 84, American scientist, expert on germs, bladder cancer.
Pamela Rooks, Indian film director and screenwriter.
Mikhail Roshchin, 77, Russian playwright.
Phillips Talbot, 95, American diplomat, Ambassador to Greece (1965–1969), President of the Asia Society (1970–1981).
Lan Wright, 87, British science fiction writer.

2
David M. Bailey, 44, American singer-songwriter, glioblastoma.
Brenda Cowling, 85, British actress.
Maurice Foster, 77, Canadian politician, MP for Algoma (1968–1993), pulmonary fibrosis.
Robert Goodnough, 92, American abstract expressionist painter, pneumonia.
Stephen Griew, 82, Canadian gerontologist.
Ruby Heafner, 86, American baseball player.
Art Jarvinen, 54, American composer, teacher and musician (The California EAR Unit).
*Kwa Geok Choo, 89, Singaporean lawyer, wife of Lee Kuan Yew, mother of Lee Hsien Loong. 
Sam Lesser, 95, British journalist.
Gillian Lowndes, 74, British ceramicist.

3
Maury Allen, 78, American sportswriter (The New York Post), lymphoma.
João Costa, 90, Portuguese Olympic fencer.
Philippa Foot, 90, British philosopher.
Sir Louis Le Bailly, 95, British admiral, Director-General of Intelligence.
Claude Lefort, 86, French philosopher.
Ben Mondor, 85, American baseball executive (Pawtucket Red Sox).
Eddie Platt, 88, American saxophonist.
Abraham Sarmiento, 88, Filipino jurist, Supreme Court Associate Justice (1987–1991).
Dianne Whalen, 59, Canadian politician, Newfoundland and Labrador MHA for Conception Bay East and Bell Island (2003–2010), cancer.
Ed Wilson, 65, Brazilian singer-songwriter, founder of Renato e Seus Blue Caps, cancer.

4
William Birenbaum, 87, American educator (Antioch College), heart failure.
Maurice Broomfield, 94, British photographer.
Henrique de Senna Fernandes, 86, Macanese author.
Gordon Lewis, 86, British aeronautical engineer.
Rajan Mehra, 76, Indian cricket umpire.
Reinhard Oehme, 82, German-born American particle physicist. (body found on this date)
Peter Warr, 72, British racing driver and Formula One team principal (Lotus), heart attack.
Brian Williams, 54, British fantasy illustrator
Sir Norman Wisdom, 95, British comedian and actor, after long illness.

5
Yakov Alpert, 99, Soviet-born American physicist.
Roy Axe, 73, British car designer (Talbot Horizon, Rover 800), cancer.
Roy Ward Baker, 93, British film director (A Night To Remember).
Jack Berntsen, 69, Norwegian folk singer.
Stan Bisset, 98, Australian rugby union player and World War II veteran.
Alba Bouwer, 90, South African writer (Afrikaans children's literature), natural causes.
Bernard Clavel, 87, French writer, natural causes.
Mary Leona Gage, 71, American pageant queen, stripped of Miss USA (1957) title, heart failure.
Karel Hardeman, 96, Dutch Olympic rower.
Josephine Drivinski Hunsinger, 95, American politician. Member of the Michigan House of Representatives for District 1 (1973-1976).
Moss Keane, 62, Irish rugby union player, bowel cancer.
Jānis Klovāns, 75, Latvian chess master.
Steve Lee, 47, Swiss musician (Gotthard), motorcycle accident.
Julio Parise Loro, 90, Italian Roman Catholic prelate, Vicar Apostolic of Napo (1978–96).
Karen McCarthy, 63, American politician, U.S. Representative from Missouri (1995–2005), Alzheimer's disease.
Børge Raahauge Nielsen, 90, Danish Olympic bronze medal-winning (1948) rower.
William Shakespeare, 61, Australian glam rock singer, heart attack.

6
Norman Christie, 85, Scottish football player and manager (Montrose F.C.).
Jean Debuf, 86, French weightlifter, Olympic bronze medalist (1956).
Don Goodsir, 73, Australian educator, author, and environmentalist.
Ivor Hale, 88, English cricketer.
Rhys Isaac, 72, Australian historian, cancer.
Antonie Kamerling, 44, Dutch actor and singer, suicide.
Ralph Kercheval, 98, American football player.
Gran Naniwa, 33, Japanese professional wrestler, myocardial blockage.
Colette Renard, 85, French singer and actress, after long illness.
Henry Sommerville, 82, Australian Olympic fencer.
Piet Wijn, 81, Dutch comics creator.

7
Ashab-ul-Haq, Bangladeshi politician.
Metring David, 90, Filipino actress and comedian.
Gail Dolgin, 65, American documentary filmmaker (Daughter from Danang), breast cancer.
Kristin Johannsen, 52, American author, educator and environmentalist.
Ljupčo Jordanovski, 57, Macedonian seismologist and politician, Acting President (2004).
Chuck Leo, 76, American football player (Boston Patriots).
Ian Morris, 53, New Zealand musician (Th' Dudes) and record producer.
Milka Planinc, 85, Yugoslavian politician, Prime Minister (1982–1986).
Guy Rouleau, 87, Canadian politician.
A. Venkatachalam, 55, Indian politician, stabbed.

8
Frank Bourgholtzer, 90, American television reporter, first full-time NBC News White House correspondent.
S. S. Chandran, 69, Indian comic actor and politician, member of the Rajya Sabha (2001–2007), heart attack. 
Jim Fuchs, 82, American shot putter, Olympic bronze medalist (1948, 1952).
Nils Hallberg, 89, Swedish actor.
John Huchra, 61, American astronomer, heart attack.
Ryō Ikebe, 92, Japanese actor (Gorath), blood poisoning.
Reg King, 65, British singer (The Action), cancer.
Simbara Maki, 71, Ivorian Olympic hurdler.
Malcolm Mencer Martin, 89, Austrian-British pediatric endocrinologist, injuries sustained after being hit by car.
Sue Miles, 66, British counter-culture activist and restaurateur.
David F. Musto, 74, American drug control expert, heart attack.
Maurice Neligan, 73, Irish surgeon, performed Ireland's first heart transplant.
Linda Norgrove, 36, British aid worker and hostage, killed during rescue attempt.
Mohammad Omar, Afghan politician, Governor of Kunduz Province, bomb blast.
Pleasant Tap, 23, American thoroughbred racehorse, euthanized due to laminitis.
Melvin Lane Powers, 68, American real estate developer, acquitted of murdering his uncle.
Karl Prantl, 86, Austrian sculptor, stroke.
Neil Richardson, 80, English composer, arranger and conductor.
Dale Roberts, 70, American baseball player (New York Yankees).
Albertina Walker, 81, American gospel music singer (The Caravans), respiratory failure.

9
Maurice Allais, 99, French economist, winner of the Nobel Memorial Prize in Economic Sciences (1988).
Mashallah Amin Sorour, 79, Iranian cyclist.
Edmund Chong Ket Wah, 54, Malaysian politician, Member of Parliament (since 2004), motorcycle accident.
Les Fell, 89, English footballer (Charlton Athletic, Crystal Palace).
Aleksandr Matveyev, 84, Russian linguist, corresponding member of the Russian Academy of Sciences, natural causes.
Isaia Rasila, 42, Fijian rugby player.
Zecharia Sitchin, 90, Azerbaijani-born American author.

10
Louis F. Bantle, 81, American chairman of U.S. Tobacco Company, lung cancer and emphysema.
Reinhold Brinkmann, 76, German musicologist.
Solomon Burke, 70, American R&B singer-songwriter ("Everybody Needs Somebody to Love"), natural causes.
Ger Feeney, Irish Gaelic footballer.
Les Gibbard, 64, New Zealand-born British political cartoonist, during routine operation.
John Graysmark, 75, British production designer and art director (Ragtime, Gorillas in the Mist, Flash Gordon).
*Hwang Jang-yop, 87, North Korean politician and defector, apparent heart attack.
Éric Joisel, 53, French wet-folding origami artist, lung cancer.
Richard Lyon-Dalberg-Acton, 4th Baron Acton, 69, British politician.
David H. McNerney, 79, American soldier and Medal of Honor recipient, lung cancer.
Adán Martín Menis, 66, Spanish politician, President of the Canary Islands (2003–2007).
Rex Rabanye, 66, jazz, fusion and soulful pop musician.
Franz Xaver Schwarzenböck, 87, German Roman Catholic auxiliary bishop of München und Freising (1972–1998).
Solly Sherman, 93, American football player (Chicago Bears).
A. Edison Stairs, 85, Canadian businessman and politician, New Brunswick MLA (1960–1978) and Minister of Finance (1974–1976), natural causes.
Walter Staley, 77, American Olympic bronze medal-winning (1952) equestrian.
Alison Stephens, 40, British classical mandolinist, cervical cancer.
Dame Joan Sutherland, 83, Australian dramatic coloratura soprano.
Richard S. Van Wagoner, 64, American historian of Mormonism and Utah.
Frank Verpillat, 63, French director and inventor.

11
Tomislav Franjković, 79, Croatian Olympic silver medal-winning (1956) water polo player.
Bill Harsha, 89, American politician, U.S. Representative from Ohio (1961–1981).
Janet MacLachlan, 77, American actress (Archie Bunker's Place, Sounder), cardiovascular complications.
Richard Morefield, 81, American embassy worker, hostage during Iran Hostage Crisis.
Marian P. Opala, 89, American jurist, Associate Justice of the Oklahoma Supreme Court (1978–2010), stroke.
Claire Rayner, 79, British author.
Georges Rutaganda, 51, Rwandan Hutu paramilitary leader, convicted war criminal, after long illness.
Robert Tishman, 94, American real estate developer (Tishman Speyer).
Donald H. Tuck, 87, Australian science fiction bibliographer.
Ian Turner, 85, American Olympic gold medal-winning (1948) rower.

12
Abul Hasnat Md. Abdul Hai, Bangladeshi politician.
Manuel Alexandre, 92, Spanish actor, cancer.
Jorge Ardila Serrano, 85, Colombian Roman Catholic prelate, Bishop of Girardot (1988–2001).
Austin Ardill, 93, British politician, member of the Parliament of Northern Ireland for Carrick.
Challenger, 51, Bangladeshi actor.
Michael Galloway, 85, American actor.
Michel Hugo, 79, French-born American cinematographer (Dynasty, Melrose Place, Mission: Impossible), lung cancer.
Angelo Infanti, 71, Italian actor, cardiac arrest.
Lionel W. McKenzie, 91, American economist.
Dick Miles, 85, American table tennis player, natural causes.
Woody Peoples, 67, American football player (San Francisco 49ers, Philadelphia Eagles).
Pepín, 78, Spanish footballer.
Belva Plain, 95, American novelist (Evergreen).

13
Juan Carlos Arteche, 53, Spanish footballer, cancer.
Eddie Baily, 85, English footballer (Tottenham Hotspur).
General Johnson, 69, American musician and record producer (Chairmen of the Board), complications of lung cancer.
Vernon Biever, 87, American photographer.
Khoisan X, 55, South African political activist, stroke.
Mary Malcolm, 92, British BBC announcer and television personality.
Marzieh, 86, Iranian singer, cancer.
Sol Steinmetz, 80, Hungarian-born American lexicographer and linguist, pneumonia.

14
Malcolm Allison, 83, English footballer (West Ham United) and manager (Manchester City, Crystal Palace), after long illness.
Glenn J. Ames, 55, American historian, cancer.
Carla Del Poggio, 84, Italian actress.
Louis Henkin, 92, American international human rights law expert and academic (Columbia Law School).
Alain Le Bussy, 63, Belgian science fiction author, complications following throat surgery.
Simon MacCorkindale, 58, British actor (Falcon Crest, Death on the Nile, Manimal, Casualty), bowel cancer.
Benoît Mandelbrot, 85, Polish-born American mathematician, pioneer of the study of fractals, pancreatic cancer.
Constance Reid, 92, American mathematics author and biographer.
Hermann Scheer, 66, German politician, member of the Bundestag (1980–2010) and Right Livelihood Award laureate (1999), after short illness.
Larry Siegfried, 71, American basketball player (Boston Celtics), heart attack.

15
Jim Dougal, 65, Northern Irish journalist (BBC News, RTÉ, UTV).
Mildred Fay Jefferson, 84, American anti-abortion activist, first black woman to graduate from Harvard Medical School.
N. Paul Kenworthy, 85, American cinematographer (The Living Desert, The Vanishing Prairie), thyroid cancer.
Georges Mathé, 88, French oncologist and immunologist, bone marrow transplant pioneer.
Vera Rózsa, 93, Hungarian voice teacher.
Johnny Sheffield, 79, American actor (Tarzan Finds a Son!, Bomba, the Jungle Boy, Knute Rockne All American), heart attack.

16
Barbara Billingsley, 94, American actress, polymyalgia (Leave It to Beaver, Airplane!, Muppet Babies).
Alfredo Bini, 83, Italian film producer.
Jack Butterfield, 91, Canadian-born American sports administrator, President of the American Hockey League (1969–1994).
Chao-Li Chi, 83, Chinese-born American actor (Falcon Crest).
Giannis Dalianidis, 86, Greek film director and screenwriter (Oi Thalassies oi Hadres, O katergaris), multiple organ dysfunction syndrome.
Eyedea, 28, American rapper and musician (Eyedea & Abilities).
Friedrich Katz, 83, Austrian anthropologist and historian, cancer.
Masud Husain Khan, 91, Indian linguist.
Ioannis Ladas, 90, Greek army officer, member of the 1967–1974 military junta.
Betty S. Murphy, 77, American lawyer, first woman to chair the National Labor Relations Board, pneumonia.
Aldo Maria Lazzarín Stella, 83, Italian-born Chilean Roman Catholic prelate, Vicar Apostolic of Aysén (1989–1998).
Valmy Thomas, 81, Puerto Rican baseball player.
Leigh Van Valen, 75, American evolutionary biologist (Red Queen's Hypothesis), respiratory infection.

17
Åsmund Apeland, 80, Norwegian politician.
Jake Dunlap, 85, Canadian football player (Ottawa Rough Riders), cancer.
John Baird Finlay, 81, Canadian politician, MP for Oxford (1993–2004).
*Emmanuel Lê Phong Thuân, 79, Vietnamese Roman Catholic prelate, Bishop of Cân Tho (since 1990).
Joe Lis, 64, American baseball player, prostate cancer.
Freddy Schuman, 85, American baseball fan (New York Yankees), heart attack.
Michael Tabor, 63, American Black Panther Party member, complications from a stroke.
Dennis Taylor, 56, American saxophonist, heart attack.

18
Luc Agbala, 63, Togo football player and referee.
Marion Brown, 79, American jazz saxophonist.
Consuelo Crespi, 82, American-born Italian countess, fashion model and editor, stroke.
David Fontana, 75, British psychologist and parapsychologist, pancreatic cancer.
Margaret Gwenver, 84, American actress (Guiding Light).
Hans Hägele, 70, German footballer, suicide by jumping from bridge.
Mel Hopkins, 75, Welsh footballer (Tottenham Hotspur, Brighton & Hove Albion).
Yertward Mazamanian, 85, American hippie.
Peng Chong, 95, Chinese politician, former National Committee member.
Billy Raimondi, 97, American baseball player
Doug Wilson, 90, British Olympic athlete.
Ken Wriedt, 83, Australian politician, Senator for Tasmania (1967–1980), Leader of the Tasmanian Opposition (1982–1986).

19
Tom Bosley, 83, American actor (Happy Days, Father Dowling Mysteries), heart failure.
Craig Charron, 42, American ice hockey player, stomach cancer.
Graham Crowden, 87, Scottish actor (If...., A Very Peculiar Practice, Waiting For God).
André Mahé, 90, French road bicycle racer.
Paul Steven Miller, 49, American disability rights leader, cancer.
John Waterlow, 94, British physiologist.

20
Jean Asfar, 92, Egyptian Olympic fencer.
Francisco Batistela, 79, Brazilian Roman Catholic prelate, Bishop of Bom Jesus da Lapa (1990–2009).
Otey Clark, 95, American baseball player (Boston Red Sox).
W. Cary Edwards, 66, American politician, New Jersey State Assemblyman (1978–1982) and Attorney General (1986–1989), cancer.
Herbert Enderton, 74, American mathematician and logician, leukemia.
Mariano Ferreyra, 23, Argentine left-wing militant, shot.
Bob Guccione, 79, American photographer and founder of Penthouse, lung cancer.
Eva Ibbotson, 85, Austrian-born British novelist (Journey to the River Sea, The Secret of Platform 13).
Coleman Jacoby, 95, American television comedy writer, pancreatic cancer.
D. Geraint James, 88, Welsh doctor.
Bill Jennings, 85, American baseball player (St. Louis Browns).
Robert Katz, 77, American writer, complications from cancer surgery.
Max Kohnstamm, 96, Dutch historian and diplomat.
Farooq Leghari, 70, Pakistani politician, President (1993–1997), heart complications.
Sir George Mallet, 87, Saint Lucian politician, Governor-General (1996–1997), cancer.
Eduard Novák, 63, Czech ice hockey player, Olympic silver (1976) and bronze (1972) medalist.
Jenny Oropeza, 53, American politician, California State Assemblywoman (2000–2006) and State Senator (since 2006), after long illness.
Robert Paynter, 82, British cinematographer (Trading Places, An American Werewolf in London, Michael Jackson's Thriller).
Harvey Phillips, 80, American tuba player, Parkinson's disease.
Gilbert Planté, 69, French Olympic footballer.
Julian Roberts, 80, British librarian.
Tony Roig, 81, American baseball player (Philadelphia Phillies, Washington Senators), after long illness.
Parthasarathy Sharma, 62, Indian Test cricketer (1974–1977), cancer.
Tikhon Stepanov, 47, Russian Orthodox prelate, Bishop of Arkhangelsk and Kholmogory (since 1996), heart attack.
Ari Up, 48, German-born British punk musician (The Slits), cancer.
Wendall Woodbury, 68, American television journalist and host (WGAL-TV), lymphoma.

21
Antonio Alatorre, 88, Mexican philologist.
Mustapha Anane, 60, Algerian footballer, after long illness.
A. Ayyappan, 61, Indian poet.
José Carbajal, 66, Uruguayan singer, guitarist, and composer (Los Olimareños), cardiac arrest.
Sir Leslie Froggatt, 90, British-born Australian business executive, CEO of Shell Australia (1969–1980), complications from Parkinson's disease.
Kjell Landmark, 80, Norwegian poet and politician, cancer.
James F. Neal, 81, American jurist, prosecuted Watergate figures, cancer.
Howard Harry Rosenbrock, 89, British electrical engineer and scientist.
Loki Schmidt, 91, German environmentalist, wife of Helmut Schmidt, illness after a fall and complications of a broken foot.
Natasha Spender, 91, British musician and writer, widow of Stephen Spender.

22
Alex Anderson, 90, American cartoonist, created characters for The Rocky and Bullwinkle Show and Crusader Rabbit.
Donald A. Andrews, 69, Canadian correctional psychologist and criminologist.
Rune Blomqvist, 85, Swedish Olympic sprint canoer.
Arthur M. Brazier, 89, American pastor and civil rights activist.
Alí Chumacero, 92, Mexican writer and poet, pneumonia.
Bill Henderson, 86, Northern Irish politician and newspaper proprietor.
Helen Hunley, 90, Canadian politician, Lieutenant Governor of Alberta (1985–1991).
Anne McDonald, 49, Australian disability rights activist, heart attack.
Franz Raschid, 56, German footballer, pancreatic cancer.
Eio Sakata, 90, Japanese professional Go player, aortic aneurysm.
Denis Simpson, 59, Canadian actor (Polka Dot Door) and singer, brain hemorrhage.
Kjell Stormoen, 89, Norwegian actor and theater director.
René Villiger, 79, Swiss painter, cancer.

23
Ralph Belknap Baldwin, 98, American planetary scientist.
Vince Banonis, 89, American football player (Chicago Cardinals, Detroit Lions).
Ior Bock, 68, Finnish actor and tour guide, stabbing.
George Cain, 66, American author, kidney failure.
Fran Crippen, 26, American swimmer, heart attack.
Leo Cullum, 68, American cartoonist (The New Yorker), cancer.
Robert Fitzpatrick, 73, American manager and actor, lung disease.
S. Neil Fujita, 89, American graphic designer, complications of a stroke.
Princess Irmingard of Bavaria, 87, German noblewoman.
Donald Leifert, 59, American science fiction actor.
Chhewang Nima, 43, Nepalese mountaineer and guide, avalanche.
Michael Porter, 59, American wrestling announcer.
Stanley Tanger, 87, American businessman, founder of Tanger Factory Outlet Centers.
David Thompson, 48, British-born Barbadian politician, Prime Minister (since 2008), pancreatic cancer.
Tom Winslow, 69, American folk musician, complications from a stroke.

24
Ralph Anderson, 86, American architect, kidney cancer.
Les Anthony, 88, Welsh rugby union player.
Bob Courtney, 87, British-born South African broadcaster and actor.
Mike Esposito, 83, American comic book artist (Spider-Man, The Flash, Wonder Woman).
Georges Frêche, 72, French politician, cardiac arrest.
Fritz Grösche, 69, German footballer and coach, cancer.
Linda Hargrove, 61, American singer-songwriter.
Andy Holmes, 51, British Olympic gold (1984, 1988) and bronze (1988) medal-winning rower, leptospirosis.
Franciszek Jarecki, 79, Polish-born American jet pilot and defector.
Lamont Johnson, 88, American actor and television director (The Twilight Zone, The Execution of Private Slovik), heart failure.
Alex Oakley, 84, Canadian Olympic race walker.
Pan Jin-yu, 96, Taiwanese last speaker of the Pazeh language.
Ignacio Ramírez de Haro, 15th Count of Bornos, 92, Spanish noble, 15th Count of Bornos, Grandee of Spain, legionella.
Burton B. Roberts, 88, American judge, New York Supreme Court Justice (1973–1998), respiratory failure.
Willie Rutherford, 65, Australian soccer player.
Sylvia Sleigh, 94, American painter, complications of a stroke.
Jack Stackpoole, 93, Australian cricketer.
David Stahl, 60, American conductor, lymphoma.
Joseph Stein, 98, American playwright (Fiddler on the Roof, Zorba).

25
Hans Arnold, 85, Swiss-born Swedish artist.
Sonny Ates, 75, American racecar driver.
Lisa Blount, 53, American actress (An Officer and a Gentleman) and film producer (The Accountant).
Sonia Burgess, 63, British immigration lawyer.
Jeff Carter, 82, Australian photographer and author.
Richard T. Gill, 82, American opera singer, heart failure.
Douglas Hooper, 83, English psychotherapist, traffic collision.
Gregory Isaacs, 59, Jamaican reggae singer, lung cancer.
Andreas Maurer, 91, Austrian politician, Landeshauptmann of Lower Austria (1966–1981).
Vesna Parun, 88, Croatian writer.
Ada Polak, 96, Norwegian art historian.
Rudy Rufer, 84, American baseball player (New York Giants).
Roy Skinner, 80, American college basketball coach (Vanderbilt), respiratory failure.

26
Jaroslava Komárková, 83, Czech Olympic athlete.
Glen Little, 84, American circus performer ("Frosty the Clown").
Mbah Maridjan, 83, Indonesian spiritual guardian of Mount Merapi (1982–2010), pyroclastic flow from Mount Merapi.
Ricardo Montez, 87, Gibraltarian character actor.
Paul the Octopus, 2, British-born World Cup oracle octopus (Sea Life Centre in Oberhausen, Germany), natural causes.
James Phelps, 78, American gospel and R&B singer, complications of diabetes.
Ana María Romero de Campero, 67, Bolivian journalist and politician, President of the Senate of Bolivia (2010), colorectal cancer.
Romeu Tuma, 79, Brazilian politician, Senator (1995–2010), multiple organ dysfunction syndrome.
Ray Watson, 87, Australian judge.

27
Mary Emma Allison, 93, American co-creator of Trick-or-Treat for UNICEF.
Denise Borino-Quinn, 46, American actress (The Sopranos), liver cancer.
Gene Fodge, 79, American baseball player (Chicago Cubs).
William Griffiths, 88, British Olympic silver medal-winning (1948) field hockey player.
Chris Gulker, 59, American photographer, programmer and writer, brain cancer.
Néstor Kirchner, 60, Argentine politician, President (2003–2007), First Gentleman (since 2007), Secretary General of UNASUR (2010), heart attack.
Paul Kolton, 87, American chairman of the American Stock Exchange (1972–1977), lymphoma.
Luigi Macaluso, 62, Italian businessman, President and Chairman of the Sowind Group, heart attack.
Owen B. Pickett, 80, American politician, U.S. Representative from Virginia (1987–2001).
*Saqr bin Mohammad al-Qassimi, 92, Emirati ruler of Ras al-Khaimah (since 1948).
Hall W. Thompson, 87, American developer of a country club that did not admit black members.
James Wall, 92, American actor (Captain Kangaroo) and stage manager, after short illness.

28
Isabella Abbott, 91, American ethnobotanist, first native Hawaiian to receive a doctorate in science.
Ibrahim Ahmad Abd al-Sattar Muhammad, 54, Iraqi general, Armed Forces Chief of Staff (1999–2003), cancer.
Harry Baldwin, 90, English footballer.
Jack Brokensha, 84, Australian jazz musician, composer and arranger.
Jesús Mateo Calderón Barrueto, 90, Peruvian Roman Catholic prelate, Bishop of Puno (1972–1998).
Robert Dickie, 46, British champion boxer, heart attack.
Robert Ellenstein, 87, American character actor.
Erling Fløtten, 72, Norwegian politician.
Watts Humphrey, 83, American software engineer.
Gerard Kelly, 51, British actor (City Lights), brain aneurysm.
 Liang Congjie, 78, Chinese environmentalist (Friends of Nature), lung infection.
James MacArthur, 72, American actor (Hawaii Five-O, Swiss Family Robinson), natural causes.
Jonathan Motzfeldt, 72, Greenlandic politician, Prime Minister (1979–1991; 1997–2002), brain hemorrhage.
Paddy Mullins, 91, Irish racehorse trainer.
Maurice Murphy, 75, British musician (London Symphony Orchestra).
Ehud Netzer, 76, Israeli archaeologist, discovered tomb of Herod the Great, injuries from a fall.
Walter Payton, 68, American jazz bassist and sousaphonist, complications from a stroke.
Anna Prieto Sandoval, 76, American tribal leader (Sycuan Band of the Kumeyaay Nation), Native American gaming enterprises pioneer, diabetes.
Jean Schmit, 79, Luxembourgian Olympic cyclist.
John Sekula, 41, American guitarist (Mushroomhead).

29
Gerhard Beyer, 69, German Olympic sports shooter.
Marcelino Camacho, 92, Spanish trade unionist.
Ronnie Clayton, 76, English footballer (Blackburn Rovers).
Geoffrey Crawley, 83, British photographer and editor, debunked Cottingley Fairies mystery.
Stefan Florescu, 83, American paralympic swimmer and table tennis player.
Mervyn Haisman, 82, British writer (Doctor Who).
George Hickenlooper, 47, American documentary filmmaker, accidental drug overdose.
Yisrael Katz, 82, Israeli public servant and government minister.
Antonio Mariscal, 95, Mexican Olympic diver.
Bärbel Mohr, 46, German author.
Bernard de Nonancourt, 90, French businessman and member of the French Resistance, owner of Laurent-Perrier.
Karlo Sakandelidze, 82, Georgian actor.
Takeshi Shudo, 61, Japanese writer, creator of Pokémon, subarachnoid hemorrhage.

30
Randall Dale Adams, 61, American anti–death penalty activist, brain tumor.
Douglas Argent, 89, British television producer and director (Fawlty Towers).
Vladimir Arsenyev, 62, Russian Africanist, ethnographer, and exhibition curator.
John Benson, 67, Scottish footballer and manager, after short illness.
Romano Bonagura, 80, Italian bobsledder, Olympic silver medalist (1964).
Leopoldo Alfredo Bravo, 50, Argentine diplomat, ambassador to Russia, cancer.
Édouard Carpentier, 84, French-born Canadian professional wrestler.
Ina Clare, 77, British actress (EastEnders).
Meta Elste-Neumann, 91, American gymnast, Olympic bronze medalist (1948), cancer.
Arthur Bernard Lewis, 84, American television producer and writer (Dallas), complications from pneumonia.
Ananías Maidana, 87, Paraguayan teacher and politician, prostate cancer.
Harry Mulisch, 83, Dutch writer (The Assault, The Discovery of Heaven), cancer.
Nachi Nozawa, 72, Japanese voice actor, lung cancer.
Clyde Summers, 91, American academic, complications of a stroke.
Mateus Feliciano Augusto Tomás, 52, Angolan Roman Catholic prelate, Bishop of Namibe (since 2009).
Howard Van Hyning, 74, American percussionist (New York City Opera), myocardial infarction.

31
Michel d'Aillières, 86, French politician.
Evelyn Baghtcheban, 81–82, Turkish-Persian opera singer.
Manfred Bock, 69, German Olympic decathlete, heart attack.
Max Barandun, 68, Swiss Olympic sprinter.
Roger Holloway, 76, British Anglican priest.
Dick Loepfe, 88, American football player (Chicago Cardinals).
Maurice Lucas, 58, American basketball player (Portland Trail Blazers, Phoenix Suns, Los Angeles Lakers), bladder cancer.
John Selfridge, 83, American mathematician.
János Simon, 81, Hungarian basketball player, EuroBasket winner (1955).
Ted Sorensen, 82, American lawyer, White House counsel (1961–1964), stroke.
Artie Wilson, 90, American baseball player (New York Giants, Birmingham Black Barons), Alzheimer's disease.

References

2010-10
10